Shoe buckles are fashion accessories worn by men and women from the mid-17th century through the 18th century to the 19th century.  Shoe buckles were made of a variety of materials including brass, steel, silver or silver gilt, and  buckles for formal wear were set with diamonds, quartz or imitation jewels.

History
Buckled shoes began to replace tied shoes in the mid-17th century: Samuel Pepys wrote in his Diary for 22 January 1660 "This day I began to put on buckles to my shoes, which I have bought yesterday of Mr. Wotton." The fashion at first remained uncommon enough though that even in 1693 a writer to a newspaper complained of the new fashion of buckles replacing ribbons for fastening shoes and knee bands. Separate buckles remained fashionable until they were abandoned along with high-heeled footwear and other aristocratic fashions in the years after the French Revolution, although they were retained as part of ceremonial and court dress until well into the 20th century. In Britain in 1791 an attempt was made by buckle manufactures to stop change in fashion by appealing to the then Prince of Wales Prince George. While the prince did start to require them for his court this didn't stop the decline of the shoe buckle. It has been suggested that the decline drove the manufacturers of steel buckles to diversify into producing a range of cut steel jewellery.

Knee buckle 
Knee buckles are used to fasten the knee-high boots just below the level of the knee.

Gallery

See also
 One, Two, Buckle My Shoe
 1700–1750 in fashion
 1750–1775 in fashion
 1775–1795 in fashion

Notes

References

Takeda, Sharon Sadako, and Kaye Durland Spilker, Fashioning Fashion: European Dress in Detail, 1700 - 1915,  Prestel USA (2010), 
 Tortora, Phyllis G. and Keith Eubank. Survey of Historic Costume. 2nd Edition, 1994. Fairchild Publications. 

Footwear accessories
Types of jewellery
17th-century fashion
18th-century fashion
19th-century fashion
Maritime culture